Saint Pizza Lounge and Gladstone Street Pizza, more commonly known as simply Gladstone Street Pizza (GSP), is a pizzeria in Portland, Oregon.

Description 

GSP is a pizzeria in southeast Portland's Creston-Kenilworth neighborhood. In 2019, Willamette Week said, "Gladstone Street Pizza's temperament is split evenly between the Buckman neighborhood's bespoke parlors and a cut-rate pepperoni mill. The pizzeria crafts simply topped, thin-crusted paragons such as Italian sausage, sweet onion and arugula-topped Tri-Colour, and the house special covered in chevre, basil and Mama Lil's peppers." The 'For the House' pizza has Italian sausage, mozzarella, arugula, and pecorino Romano cheese.

The newspaper's Kelly Clarke wrote in 2011, "Serving big, cheesy, garlicky pies without an ounce of pretension, this bare-bones pizza chamber only proofs enough dough for 30 pizzas a night. They don't always run out, but it's not worth arriving late and missing out on the chance of wrapping your lips around a chewy-crusted slice topped with peppery arugula, sweet onions and sausage or groaning with Canadian bacon and pepperoni." The menu has also included local microbrews and a Caesar salad.

History 
John Mitchell is co-owner and pizzaiolo; he wanted to open a pizzeria with New Haven-style pizza. Previously, he operated Gladstone Coffee and Gallery at the same address.

In 2011, Steve Beaven of The Oregonian credited GSP (and the Saint Pizza Lounge) and Gladstone Street Pub for "[creating] momentum on a formerly somnolent stretch of an often-overlooked street south of Southeast Powell Boulevard".

For Pizza Week in 2014, Mitchell collaborated with John Fimmano, co-owner and chef of nearby Shut Up and Eat, to re-create the latter's roast-pork sandwich in pizza form.

Reception 

In his 2012 overview of "pizzas worth your dough", Michael Russell of The Oregonian wrote:  He also said Saint Pizza Lounge had a "top-notch" cocktail program with an "enviable list of local spirits" in the newspaper's 2012 overview of "the best spots to drink in Portland's cocktail scene". In 2016, readers of The Oregonian named GSP "People's Choice for Portland's best pizza place".

Erin DeJesus included GSP in Eater Portland's 2012 list of "The (Sweet) 16 Essential Pizzerias of Portland". Editors of Slice selected GSP to represent Portland, along with Apizza Scholls, Ken's Artisan Pizza, and Lovely's Fifty-Fifty, in a 2012 list of the eight best pizzas in the Pacific Northwest. The pizzerias were chosen "despite not having regional styles steeped in history".

See also

 Pizza in Portland, Oregon

References

External links 

 
 Gladstone Street Pizza & Saint Pizza Lounge at Zomato

Creston-Kenilworth, Portland, Oregon
Pizzerias in Portland, Oregon